BDX could mean any of the following:

 Becton Dickinson an American medical technology company
 BDX Armored personnel carrier manufactured by Beherman Demoen Engineering a Belgian specialized vehicle manufacturer.